Kathleen Holland Hicks (born September 25, 1970) is an American government official who has served as the United States deputy secretary of defense since February 9, 2021. She is the first Senate-confirmed woman in this role. Hicks previously served as the principal deputy under secretary of defense for policy during the Obama administration. By 2020 Hicks was an American academic and national security advisor working as a senior vice president and director of the international security program at the Center for Strategic and International Studies. She is the highest ranking woman currently serving in the United States Department of Defense.

Education 
Hicks completed a B.A in history and politics at Mount Holyoke College in 1991, where she graduated with magna cum laude and Phi Beta Kappa honors. In 1993, she earned a M.P.A. in national security studies at University of Maryland, College Park. Hicks completed a Ph.D. in political science from Massachusetts Institute of Technology in 2010. Her dissertation was titled Change Agents: Who Leads and Why in the Execution of US National Security Policy. Charles Stewart III was Hicks' doctoral advisor.

Career 
From 1993 to 2006, Hicks was a career civil servant in the Office of the Secretary of Defense, rising from Presidential Management Intern to the Senior Executive Service. She was a senior fellow at the Center for Strategic and International Studies (CSIS) from 2006 to 2009, leading a variety of national security research projects.

During the Obama administration in 2009, Hicks was appointed deputy undersecretary of defense for strategy, plans and forces in 2009. In 2012, Hicks was the principal deputy under secretary of defense for policy during the Obama administration. In that role, she was a liaison for the 2010 Quadrennial Defense Review and oversaw the 2012 Defense Strategic Guidance. Hicks was a presidentially appointed commissioner for the National Commission on the Future of the Army. She is a Member of the Council on Foreign Relations and serves on the boards of advisors for the Truman National Security Project and SoldierStrong.

Hicks formerly served as a senior vice president, Henry A. Kissinger Chair, and director of the international security program at CSIS. She concurrently served as the Donald Marron scholar at the Paul H. Nitze School of Advanced International Studies. In October 2020, she also served on the CSIS-LSHTM High-Level Panel on Vaccine Confidence and Misinformation amid the COVID-19 pandemic, co-chaired by Heidi Larson and J. Stephen Morrison.

United States Deputy Secretary of Defense

On December 30, 2020, Hicks was announced as U.S. president-elect Joe Biden's nominee for United States deputy secretary of defense. She appeared before the Senate Armed Services Committee on February 2, 2021. She was confirmed by voice vote by the full Senate on February 8, 2021 and sworn into office on February 9, 2021.

Hicks will lead the modernization of the country's nuclear triad.

Selected works

References

External links 

1970 births
Living people
People from Fairfield, California
Mount Holyoke College alumni
University of Maryland, College Park alumni
Massachusetts Institute of Technology alumni
American women academics
American women civil servants
Obama administration personnel
United States Department of Defense officials
Biden administration personnel
United States Deputy Secretaries of Defense
21st-century American women